No Angels are an all-female pop group from Germany, formed in 2000. Originally a quintet, consisting of band members Nadja Benaissa, Lucy Diakovska, Sandy Mölling, Vanessa Petruo, and Jessica Wahls, they originated on the debut season of the German adaptation of the talent series Popstars and were one of the first television-cast acts to achieve sustainable success throughout Central Europe in the early 2000s. Following a major success with record-breaking single "Daylight in Your Eyes" and debut album Elle'ments in 2001, a series of hit records established their position as one of the most successful female band vocalists to emerge in the early decade. With four number-one hits, four number-one albums and record sales of more than 5.0 million, they became one of the most successful acts in German music history, winning three ECHOs, a World Music Award, a NRJ Music Award, two Comets, a Bambi and a Goldene Kamera.

In fall 2003, the members went their separate ways due to lasting exhaustion, focusing on their individual solo careers in music, theatre, television and film. In 2007, four members of the original line-up re-formed permanently and recorded their first studio album in over four years, Destiny (2007). A year after, the group represented Germany it the Eurovision Song Contest 2008 in Belgrade, Serbia, where they finished 23rd with their song "Disappear".  A second post-reunion album, titled Welcome to the Dance and released in 2009, failed commercially. In September 2010, Benaissa officially left the band due to private reasons, leaving No Angels as a trio before they went into another hiatus. In early 2021, the band reformed as a quartet, commemorating with their 2001 debut. Their sixth studio album 20, a collection of re-recordings and new songs, was released in June 2021 and became their fourth chart topper.

History

2000: Formation on Popstars
The members of No Angels were selected on the RTL2 channel's first series of Popstars, a reality talent show which set about producing a five-piece girl group. Acquired by Tresor TV television producer Holger Roost-Macias at the MIPTV Media Market event in Cannes, France, in 2000, the series was the third adaptation of the format following both an Australian and a New Zealand version. In August and September of the same year, over 4,300 hopefuls turned up to  auditions in Hamburg, Berlin, Frankfurt, Leipzig, Cologne, Oberhausen, Stuttgart and Munich which required both singing and dancing experience. The judges consisted of Dutch entertainer Simone Angel, concert booker Mario M. Mendryzcki and Rainer Moslener, an A&R director of Polydor Records.

32 out of 200 girls eventually made it from the local recall shows to Mallorca, Spain, to get trained in singing, dancing, and fitness. While the judges continued eliminating two or three girls each day with the help of choreographer Detlef Soost and British vocal coach Robert Bicknel, eleven finalists remained and were sent home to prepare. After a final elimination round, Nadja Benaissa, Lucy Diakovska, Sandy Mölling, Vanessa Petruo and Jessica Wahls were chosen, and signed a recording contract with Polydor. Managed by Joy Berhanu during their first year, the girls were named No Angels following a public televoting and moved in together near Munich. With the final members of the group in place, the program followed the group during its recording sessions, photo and music video shoots and other promotional commitments such as showcases and instores. The show concluded with the band's first public live performance at The Dome at the Dortmunder Westfalenhalle in February 2001.

2001: Commercial breakthrough with Elle'ments
After weeks of recording, No Angels released their debut single, "Daylight in Your Eyes" on 5 February 2001. The song instantly entered the top position on the Austrian, German and Swiss Singles and Airplay Charts, making it one of the most successful debuts of the year. Selling over one million copies, the song also proved to be a hit outside German-speaking Europe when it entered the singles charts of France, Latvia, Poland and the United Kingdom, and even became a number-one success in Brazil, and Estonia. Although an alternate version of the original music video was filmed for the North American market the following year, both the video and the song saw minor commercial success overseas. However, "Daylight in Your Eyes" peaked at number 36 on the Billboard Hot Singles Sales chart in June 2002.

The band released their debut album, Elle'ments. Involving production by German producers Thorsten Brötzmann, Leslie Mandoki, and Peter Ries, Elle'ments also entered the Austrian, German and Swiss Albums Chart at number-one. No Angels broke records for becoming the "first act to ever debut at the top position in Austria, Germany, and Switzerland with both its debut single and debut album." The album would go on to sell more than one million copies worldwide, making it the biggest-selling German album of 2001. Elle'ments was eventually certified triple platinum and septuplicate gold by the IFPI, and earned the band several internationally acclaimed prizes such as a Bambi, two ECHO Awards and a World Music Award.

Riding a wave of publicity and hype, the group's second single, "Rivers of Joy", became a top ten hit, while third single, "There Must Be an Angel", a cover version of the 1985 hit by British pop duo Eurythmics, continued the group's high record sales by topping the charts once again in Austria and Germany. The last single released from Elle'ments was a double A-side of album cut "When the Angels Sing", and "Atlantis", a duet with the song's original performer Donovan. The band had re-recorded the song for the closing credits of the Walt Disney Feature Animation picture Atlantis: The Lost Empire. It became a top five entry in Germany, and was subsequently certified Gold. Following this and two encounters as the opening act for the German leg of both DJ Bobo and Westlife's 2001 concert tours, No Angels embarked on their first own concert tour in October 2001. Compiling more than 30 dates, the tour concluded in December 2001 with all shows reportedly being sold out.

2002: Career development on Now... Us!
In June 2002, No Angels released their second album, Now... Us!, which featured co-writes by all members and received critical acclaim from many critics who believed the band would not last past their first album. The album debuted at number one on the German Album Chart and at number two and four on the Austrian and Swiss albums chart respectively, and was eventually certified platinum and double gold by the IFPI. Producers such as Mousse T. consulted on Now... Us!, whose media-critical leading single "Something About Us", penned by band member Petruo, became the group's third non-consecutive number-one hit in Austria and Germany within a period of 16 months.
Further singles released from the album included Latin pop ballad "Still in Love with You", which reached the top five and was awarded a NRJ Music Award the following year, as well as Mousse T.-produced funk track "Let's Go to Bed", the band's first release to miss the German top ten.

Following an exclusive swing concert at the Berlin Tränenpalast in October, No Angels soon followed with a DVD and a live album, titled When the Angels Swing, featuring their biggest hits and selected songs from their first two albums, re-arranged by Grammy Award-nominated jazz musician Till Brönner. Critically acclaimed by critics, the album reached number nine of the German Albums Chart, eventually going gold. In November, the girls embarked on their second national concert tour, the Four Seasons Tour, playing sell-out shows in theatres across German-speaking Europe. Acts such as B3 and the Sugababes served as their support.

Soon after the girls experienced a bit of turbulence when Jessica Wahls announced she was taking a break from the band to give birth to her first child. Although the girls agreed on Jessica's return the following year and Wahls was positive of a re-join after her daughter's birth in March 2003, No Angels' management eventually decided on her departure in July 2003 as the group had equally successful went on as a quartet. While the singer accepted a recording contract as a solo artist with the group's label, Sandy Mölling later noted Jessica's pregnancy marked "the beginning of the end of No Angels".

2003–2004: Pure era and disbandment
In early 2003, the remaining four members of No Angels began intensifying work on their third regular album. Encouraged to exercise more self-control on the longplayer, the band took over responsibility in recording and selecting songs to guarantee a more personal effort — a step that challenged criticism and growing scepticism among the band's label Cheyenne Records and recording company Polydor. Titled Pure, the album was eventually released in August 2003 and became the band's third number-one album in Germany. Sporting a more mature side of pop music, it earned them their best reactions yet, drawing comparisons to Madonna's album Ray of Light (1998) as well as other female groups such as All Saints and the Sugababes. With a total of about 150,000 copies sold however, it failed to achieve the success of its two best-selling predecessors, still going gold. The pop rock-influenced leading single "No Angel (It's All in Your Mind)" became the group's fourth non-consecutive number-one single in Germany and seventh top ten hit in Austria, while mediterran "Someday" and R&B-driven "Feelgood Lies" both reached the top five of the charts.

Further planned single releases off the album never materialised. On 7 September 2003, the quartet announced that they would not come together for a new No Angels project in 2004 due to lasting exhaustion and instead were preparing their official disbandment towards the end of the year. While the media began a never-ending speculation about the reasons for their split and the pro and contra of a "creative pause", the girls and their management arranged the cancellation of all dates of their scheduled 2004 Pure Acoustic Tour. Even so, the band agreed on releasing a final album, The Best of No Angels, in December 2003. Apart from a collection of all singles, the band had released between the years of 2001 and 2003, the compilation album also contained a reworked version of one of the debut album tracks, "Reason". Involving a re-joined Jessica Wahls, it was released as the band's final single before their split and became another top ten success for the group. A charity single featuring the band's vocals, "Do They Know It's Christmas?", was released simultaneously and reached number three on the German singles chart.

After a farewell concert in the Munich Olympiahalle on 28 November, several promotional television appearances, and a private unplugged performance in the Munich P1 club on 12 December 2003, No Angels each went their separate ways, concentrating on their individual solo careers in music, theatre, television and film. A live compilation of their P1 concert, titled Acoustic Angels, would become their final release on the Cheyenne label in July 2004.

2007–2008: First reunion and Eurovision Song Contest
After listening to a few old recordings, Lucy Diakovska approached her former bandmates in mid-2006 to arrange a first meeting with all original band members for years. While Vanessa Petruo refused to re-join the band in favour of an independent solo career in music and film, all other members of the original line-up agreed upon Diakovska's request to reunite for a musical comeback, and the band eventually took action to prepare their next album in secrecy from public. Following weeks of public rumors about a reunion of the band, an official press conference on 31 January 2007 announced that No Angels had reformed and were working on a new studio album with producers Boogieman, Tobias Gustafsson, Steve Mac, Adrian Newman, and the Redfly team.

 Although acclaimed and distinguished by the media, the reunion widely failed to link previous successes. The band's first commercial release in years, Destiny, received a lukewarm reception from music critics, and debuted at number 4 in Germany, number 14 in Austria and number 22 in Switzerland, making it the band's first regular studio album release neither to reach the top position on the German Media Control Charts nor the top ten in Austria and Switzerland respectively. It eventually sold 30,000 copies domestically during its run on the charts, also making it No Angels' lowest selling album to date. While the album's lead single "Goodbye to Yesterday" still made it to the top five, follow-up "Maybe" and double A-single "Amaze Me"/"Teardrops" became No Angels' lowest-charting singles to date, never making it to the top 20 of any chart. In March 2008, the album was re-released as Destiny Reloaded, including previously unreleased songs, remixes and B-sides. In fall 2007, No Angels produced the theme song, "Life Is a Miracle" and a music video for the Warner Bros. animated feature Kleiner Dodo.

In January 2008, it was announced that the group had qualified for the Grand Prix Vorentscheid, the German national pre-selection of the Eurovision Song Contest 2008. Following several weeks of promotional appearances, No Angels entered the competition in March with Remee-and-Troelsen-produced "Disappear", competing against all-male groups Marquess and Cinema Bizarre, and singers Tommy Reeve and Carolin Fortenbacher. Widely considered as early favourites by the media, the band eventually finished first, having earned tight 50,5% of the audience vote over Fortenbacher in the second and final election round. Released on 29 February 2008, "Disappear" reached number four in Germany, where it became the band's biggest-selling single in years. With Germany being one of the biggest financial contributors to the European Broadcasting Union, No Angels were allowed to skip the contest's semi-finals and automatically qualified  for competition with 24 other countries in the finals of the ESC in May 2008. An estimated 100 million fans watched the final contest, and viewers from all 43 participating nations voted for their favourite performers via text message and telephone. No Angels eventually ranked 23rd place out of the 25 countries that participated with a total of 14 points – taking 12 points from Bulgaria, band member Lucy Diakovska's native country, and 2 points from Switzerland only. Only the United Kingdom and Poland placed below the four-member female band.

2009–2011: Welcome to the Dance 
Devastated by their performance at the Eurovision Song Contest 2008, the band went into a hiatus. Having managed themselves since their reformation, they signed a deal with Khalid Schröder's Kool Management in mid-2008, and started work on their fifth studio album Welcome to the Dance, involving a smaller team of North American musicians such as The Writing Camp, Adam Messinger, Nasri Atweh, Bill Blast, and Aaron Pearce. Taking the group's work further into the dance and electronic genres, it was released on 11 September 2009, following several delays after band member Nadja Benaissa's charge of grievous bodily harm and temporary imprisonment in April 2010. Released to generally mixed reviews by critics, the album debuted at number 26 in Germany where it became both the band's lowest-charting and -selling album yet. Welcome to the Dances first and only single "One Life", however, reached number 15 on the German Singles Chart. Plans for a second single, "Derailed", were eventually scrapped for unknown reasons.

In May 2010, the band began their five-date acoustic An Intimate Evening With Tour in Munich, their first concert tour in eight years. The stripped-down club tour was inspired by their 2003 acoustic concert, and saw the band performing songs from all of their five studio albums. Benaissa did not take part in the tour as she had called in sick a week before, prompting the remaining trio to re-arrange their set at the last minute. Generally well received by the media, the tour was initially said to be extended in 2011. In September 2010, Benaissa announced her departure from the group following her two-year suspended sentence and 300 hours of community service a month before, leaving the band as a trio. While the remaining three members of the band were said to released a live album in 2011, this project and other plans announced for the tenth anniversary of the band failed to materialize in favor of individual solo projects. In 2014, Diakovska confirmed that the band had dissolved again with no new commercial projects planned.

2020–present: Second reunion and 20 
 
In late 2020, BMG Rights Management acquired the catalog of No Angels' former label Cheyenne Records. On 27 November 2020, following their absence from digital streaming platforms for five years, the band's backup catalog from 2000 to 2004 was issued online, accompanied by a digital campaign as well as the release of high-quality versions of their original music videos. Released to strong streaming numbers, a revived interest from the media and their fan base prompted Benaissa, Diakovska, Mölling and Wahls to launch an official Instagram account through which they began sharing private photos and hosted several livestreams in the weeks following. With BMG interested in issuing updated versions of their early catalog, the quartet re-formed in January 2021 to record new vocals for a Celebration Version of "Daylight in Your Eyes" along with producer and manager Christian Geller. Commemorating with the 2001 release of the song, it was released on 12 February 2021 and reached the top ten of the German Download Chart. 

Following their first performance in a decade on Schlagerchampions 2021, the quartet signed a new recording deal with BMG and began work on 20, their first full-length album release since 2009, with plans to expand the anniversary celebrations. Released on 4 June 2021, No Angels recorded four original songs and sixteen updated versions of songs that were selected from their first three studio albums for 20. Produced by Geller, the album received largely mixed reviews from critics, some of whom complimented the more cohesive, mature production, while others questioned the overall value of the project. 20 debuted at number one on the German Albums Chart, becoming No Angels' first chart topper in nearly two decades, and reached the top ten in Austria and Switzerland. A second single, the Celebration Version of "Still in Love with You," was released the same month, followed by "Mad Wild" and "When the Angels Sing" in August and October, respectively. In June 2022, the band kicked off their Celebration Tour at the Kindl-Bühne Wuhlheide. Continued in September 2022, the tour compromised ten concerts throughout Germany and concluded on 8 October 2022.

Discography

Studio albums
 Elle'ments (2001)
 Now... Us! (2002)
 Pure (2003)
 Destiny (2007)
 Welcome to the Dance (2009)
 20 (2021)

Concert tours
 Rivers of Joy Tour (2001)
 Four Seasons Tour (2002)
 An Intimate Evening with No Angels Tour (2010)
 Celebration Tour (2022)

Awards

2001
 Bambi – "Pop National"
 Bravo Otto (Gold) – "Superband Pop"
 Comet – "Best Act National"
 Eins Live Krone – "Best Newcomer"
 Goldene Henne – "Music"
 Top of the Pops Award – "Top Single Germany"

2002
 Bravo Otto (Gold) – "Superband Pop"
 Comet – "Viewer's Choice Award"
 ECHO – "Best National Group – Rock/Pop"
 ECHO – "Best National Single – Rock/Pop"
 Eins Live Krone – "Best Band"
 Radio Regebogen Award – "Newcomer 2001"
 World Music Awards – "Best-selling German Act"

2003
 Bravo Otto (Gold) – "Superband Pop"
 Comet – "Band National"
 ECHO – "Best National Videoclip"
 Eins Live Krone – "Best Single"
 Goldene Kamera – "Best Band"
 NRJ Music Awards – "Best German Song"

2007
 Bayrischer Musiklöwe – "Best Comeback"

2009
 Szenepreis – "Song of the Year 2008 – national"

2010
 Szenepreis – "Song of the Year 2009 – national"

2021
 Preis für Popkultur – Lifetime Achievement Award

References

External links

 

 
 

 
Musical groups established in 2001
German girl groups
World Music Awards winners
German Eurodance groups
Popstars winners
Eurovision Song Contest entrants for Germany
Eurovision Song Contest entrants of 2008
Musical groups reestablished in 2006
Musical groups reestablished in 2021
German pop music groups
English-language singers from Germany
Angels in popular culture